Procrastinate! Music Traitors is an American record label started by the members of the band Brand New. Little is known about the label other than its first release, a re-release of Kevin Devine's 2006 album Put Your Ghost to Rest.

On January 11, 2010, Brand New announced via their Twitter account that their 2006 album, The Devil and God Are Raging Inside Me, would be released as a 2-LP white vinyl record through Procrastinate! Music Traitors on March 23, 2010.

Discography

Joint-label releases

See also
 List of record labels

References

External links
 

American record labels
Alternative rock record labels
Record labels established in 2004
2004 establishments in the United States